The 2012–13 season was Udinese Calcio's 33rd season in Serie A, and their 18th consecutive season in the top-flight. Having finished 3rd in the 2011–12 Serie A, the team qualified for the play-off round of the 2012–13 UEFA Champions League. Defeated by Braga, Udinese dropped down to the group stage of the UEFA Europa League. The club also competed in Serie A and the Coppa Italia.

Kit

Players

Squad information
As of 14 August 2012

Transfers

In

Out

Contract renewals

Pre-season and friendlies

Competitions

Serie A

League table

Results summary

Results by round

Matches

Coppa Italia

UEFA Champions League

Play-off round

UEFA Europa League

Group stage

Statistics

Appearances and goals

|-
! colspan="15" style="background:#dcdcdc; text-align:center"| Goalkeepers

|-
! colspan="15" style="background:#dcdcdc; text-align:center"| Defenders

|-
! colspan="15" style="background:#dcdcdc; text-align:center"| Midfielders

|-
! colspan="15" style="background:#dcdcdc; text-align:center"| Forwards

|-
! colspan="15" style="background:#dcdcdc; text-align:center"| Players transferred out during the season

Goalscorers

Last updated: 19 May 2013

References

Udinese Calcio seasons
Udinese
Udinese
Udinese